Felix Chimaokwu (born 7 November 1985) is a Nigerian footballer who plays in forward position. He played for Mohammedan Sporting in the I-League, and last played for I-League team Churchill Brothers SC. Chimaokwu partnering fellow Nigerian striker Odafe Onyeka Okolie scored record goals and won maiden I-League trophy for Churchill Brothers.

References

External links
 http://goal.com/en-india/people/nicaragua/25456/felix-chimaokwu

1985 births
Living people
Nigerian footballers
Churchill Brothers FC Goa players
Chirag United Club Kerala players
I-League players
Association football forwards